Charles Hirschinger was a member of the Wisconsin State Assembly.

Biography
Hirschiner was born on February 26, 1837. Later, he would reside on a farm in Baraboo (town), Wisconsin. He died on April 11, 1925.

Political career
Hirschinger was a member of the Assembly during the 1893 and 1895 sessions. Other positions he held include Chairman (similar to Mayor) of Baraboo and of Freedom, Sauk County, Wisconsin and justice of the peace. He was a Republican.

References

External links

Wisconsin Historical Society

People from Baraboo, Wisconsin
Republican Party members of the Wisconsin State Assembly
Mayors of places in Wisconsin
American justices of the peace
Farmers from Wisconsin
1837 births
1925 deaths
Burials in Wisconsin